Johnsville is an unincorporated community in Bracken County, in the U.S. state of Kentucky.

History
A post office called Johnsville was established in 1879, and remained in operation until 1906. The community was named for two Messrs. John, the town merchants.

References

Unincorporated communities in Bracken County, Kentucky
Unincorporated communities in Kentucky